Lighthouse Theatre is a performing arts theatre in Kettering, England which opened in 2008. It is the main performing arts venue in the town following closure and demolition of the Kettering Savoy in 1997. The 560-seat theatre is sited at the Kettering Conference Centre, Thurston Dr, Kettering NN15 6PB.

References

External links
Whats On

Theatres in Northamptonshire